Minbun is a rural locality in the Tablelands Region, Queensland, Australia. In the  Minbun had a population of 75 people.

Geography 
Minbun railway station is an abandoned railway station on the now-closed Millaa Millaa branch of the Tablelands railway line.

History 
The locality takes its name from the Minbun railway station name, which was assigned on 23 July 1920 by the Queensland Railways Department. It is an Aboriginal word meaning brown possum.

Nash Road State School opened on 1 September 1922. In May 1925 it was renamed Minbun State School. It closed in 1974.

The railway line between Kairi railway station and Millaa Millaa railway station (including Minbun railway station) closed in 1964.

In the  Minbun had a population of 75 people.

References 

Tablelands Region
Localities in Queensland